Daniel Thurston (March 1, 1719, Bradford, Massachusetts - July 14, 1805, Bradford, Massachusetts), was an Officer during the American Revolution, a member of the Committee of Safety and a member of the committee drafting the Massachusetts State Constitution.

Family
He was the eldest son of Benjamin Thurston and Mary Gage, whose family had a history of military service in America dating back to MG Humphrey Atherton. He married first on 3 September 1741 Hannah Parker, second on 10 September 1761 Judith Gerrish, and third on 17 September 1767 Elizabeth Rolfe.

His son Nathaniel Thurston (January 17, 1755 - October 21, 1811) was also a member of the Massachusetts Legislature.

Military and political career
Thurston was a captain of the Bradford Militia as early as 1765.

Only one web source actually attributes to him the rank of colonel. However, at least three of his brothers-in-law held that rank (Joseph Gerrish, Samuel Gerrish and Jacob Gerrish all commanded regiments) during the Revolution.

  
Multiple sources list him as a member of the Committee to Draft the Massachusetts State Constitution.

Sources
Vital Records of the Town of Bradford Essex Co. Mass. to the Year 1850.

Continental Army officers from Massachusetts
People of colonial Massachusetts
1719 births
1805 deaths
People from Bradford, Massachusetts